Walker is an unincorporated community in Wood County, West Virginia, United States. Walker has a post office with ZIP code 26180.

References

Unincorporated communities in Wood County, West Virginia
Unincorporated communities in West Virginia